"Feelings" is a song by the Brazilian singer Morris Albert, who also wrote the lyrics. Albert released "Feelings" in 1974 as a single and later included it as the title track of his 1975 debut album. The song's lyrics, recognizable by their "whoa whoa whoa" chorus, concern the singer's inability to "forget my feelings of love". Albert's original recording of the song was very successful, performing well internationally. 

In mid-1975, "Feelings" peaked at number six on the Billboard Hot 100 and number two on the Adult Contemporary chart in the United States. In 1986, French songwriter Louis Gasté successfully sued Albert for copyright infringement on the grounds that the tune was taken from Gasté's 1957 song "Pour Toi"; Gasté is now credited as the song's co-author.

Chart history

Weekly charts

Year-end charts

Certifications

Dispute over authorship
At the time of "Feelings"'s greatest commercial success, it was solely credited to Albert himself. In 1986, the French songwriter Loulou Gasté sued Morris Albert for copyright infringement, claiming that "Feelings" plagiarized the melody of his 1956 song "Pour Toi". Gasté won the lawsuit, upheld on appeal in 1988; they now share the credits of the song.

Recordings of the song have credited authorship variously to Albert alone, to Albert and Gasté (since the late 1980s), to Albert and Michel Jourdan (because of the French lyrics Dis-Lui), and to Albert and "Kaisermann". The last of these attributions is redundant, since the singer's real name is Mauricio Alberto Kaisermann.

Other versions 
In the years after its release, "Feelings" has been performed by many other vocalists. A version by Chicago soul singer Walter Jackson reached number 93 on Billboards pop chart in January 1977.

In 1975 Wess recorded the cover of the song for the album Wess & Dori released in Brazil (Young, 304.1052).

Bobby Vinton sang "Feelings" on his 1975 album Heart of Hearts.

An instrumental version of the song was included on Ubaldo Continiello's soundtrack to the 1978 Italian film Last Feelings.

During a lecture at Chautauqua Institution, Julie Andrews stated that she considered this song too difficult to sing because it had no meaning behind it.

The Gong Show had an episode in which every contestant sang this song.

In "Switch", a 1990 Pepsi commercial, MC Hammer sings "Feelings" instead of "U Can't Touch This" when given a non-Pepsi drink. (In fact Hammer lip-synched to a session singer.)

References

1974 songs
1974 singles
1970s ballads
Morris Albert songs
2003 singles
Sakis Rouvas songs
Engelbert Humperdinck songs
Ella Fitzgerald songs
Shirley Bassey songs
Glen Campbell songs
Frank Sinatra songs
The O'Jays songs
Percy Faith songs
José José songs
Caetano Veloso songs
Nina Simone songs
Johnny Mathis songs
Dobie Gray songs
Perry Como songs
The Offspring songs
Andy Williams songs
Number-one singles in Brazil
RCA Records singles
Songs involved in plagiarism controversies
English-language Greek songs